The Niederwald monument is a monument located in the Niederwald, near Rüdesheim am Rhein in Hesse, Germany, built between 1871 and 1883 to commemorate the Unification of Germany. The monument is located within the Rhine Gorge, a larger UNESCO World Heritage Site. It overlooks the Rhine Valley and the town of Bingen on the far side.

History 
The monument was constructed to commemorate the founding of the German Empire in 1871 after the end of the Franco-Prussian War. The first stone was laid on 16 September 1871 by Kaiser Wilhelm I. The sculptor was Johannes Schilling, and the architect was Karl Weißbach. The total cost of the work is estimated at one million gold marks. The monument was inaugurated on 28 September 1883.

Description

Structure 
Her right hand holds the recovered crown, and her left holds the Imperial Sword.

Beneath Germania is a large relief depicting Kaiser Wilhelm I riding a horse with the nobility, army commanders, and soldiers. The relief has the lyrics to "Die Wacht am Rhein" (Watch on the Rhine) engraved.

The right side of the monument is considered the "peace statue", while the left is considered the "war statue."

Inscription 

The monument's main inscription is engraved on the pedestal of the Germania statue:
{|
|
|In memory
of the unanimous
victorious uprising
of the German People
and of the
reinstitution
of the German State
1870–1871
|}

Location 
The  is a broad hill on the right bank of the Rhine located next to the tributary Wisper, opposite Bingen am Rhein. The hill forms the southwestern apex of the Taunus range. Its summit is covered by a dense forest of oak and beech. Its southern and western sides, which descend sharply to Rüdesheim am Rhein and Assmannshausen, are covered with vineyards. The monument is located at the edge of the forest, on the crest of the hill above Rüdesheim.

Access
The Niederwalddenkmal can be reached by gondola lift (formerly a rack railway), from Rüdesheim to Niederwald, by car, by chairlift from Assmannshausen, or by trails on foot.

References

External links

 

Buildings and structures completed in 1887
Landmarks in Germany
Monuments and memorials in Germany
Buildings and structures in Rheingau-Taunus-Kreis
Tourist attractions in Hesse
Sculptures of men in Germany
Statues in Germany
Outdoor sculptures in Germany
Rheingau
William I, German Emperor